VMX Racing is a video game developed by American company Studio e and published by Playmates Interactive Ent. for the PlayStation in 1997.

Reception

The game received unfavorable reviews according to the review aggregation website GameRankings. Next Generation said, "The one redeeming feature the game offers is the ability to perform maneuvers and tricks by manipulating the throttle settings. But whatever entertainment value this feature holds is soon lost in the overall bland feeling the rest of the game inspires." Many reviewers gave the game positive to mixed to unfavorable reviews, months before it was released Stateside.

Notes

References

External links
 Official website
 

1997 video games
Motorcycle video games
PlayStation (console) games
PlayStation (console)-only games
Video games developed in the United States